Wuppertal Zoo ( or Zoo Wuppertal) is a  zoo in Wuppertal, Germany. About 5,000 animals representing about 500 species from around the world live at the zoo, including apes, monkeys, bears, big cats, elephants, as well as birds, reptiles, and fish.

History 

The zoo was founded on 5 December 1879 by a joint-stock company, Gesellschaft Zoologischer Garten. The central building opened together with the zoo itself on 8 September 1881. It featured 34 animals, among them a pair of wolves and a bear. Since then, the zoo has been steadily expanded.

In 1937, the joint-stock company who owned the zoo struggled due to economic hardships, and operations were transferred to the Wuppertal city council since then.

During world War II, Zoo Wuppertal was not as badly damaged compared to other German zoos. At that time, a majority of the animals were evacuated to the Berlin and Poznan zoos and did not return.

In 1946, the Zoo Banqueting Hall hosted British war crimes trials especially concerning the individuals brought to the dock by the Special Air Service War Crimes Investigation Team. Major Alastair Hunt was responsible for trying several Nazi war criminals, notably Gestapo and SS Commander Standartenfuhrer Erich Isselhorst and Fritz Hartjenstein.

The late 1900s through 2000s saw major upgrades and renovations regarding the zoo's exhibits. A new large cat building was constructed in 1970 to replace the old lion house and moated lion enclosure, followed by a renovated aquarium in 1974, an ape pavilion in 1978, a renovated primate house in 1985, and an aviary for South American birds (added as a section to the bird building that was built in 1960) in 1993.

In 1995, a new elephant house was constructed with a 3-acre outdoor yard and 10,750 square-foot (1,000 square-metre) indoor quarters, giving the zoo's herd of elephants expanded room.

Visitors can view the gorillas through a large glass window. The drill monkey enclosure was also renovated in 2006.

On 24 May 2007, the zoo opened a new enclosure for lions and tigers. The  lion enclosure is claimed to be the largest in a German zoo, and the Siberian tigers now live in several enclosures in the Valley of Tigers.

Anori, a polar bear cub born on 4 January 2012, who shares a father with the internationally well-known late polar bear Knut, made her debut to the public alongside her mother Vilma on Thursday, 29 March 2012. Until then, a camera inside their enclosure had been monitoring her progress learning to walk and get around.

Animals & Exhibits 

The zoo's rocky and hilly terrain as well as the city's humid and rainy climate has led their collection to specialize in animals native to alpine tundra, temperate deciduous forest, and tropical rainforest.

Modern enclosures and zoo buildings exist for elephants and apes, there is a house for birds with a specially designed hall, where freely flying birds can be observed, and a small combined aquarium/terrarium.

Location 

The zoo lies in the western part of Wuppertal on the so-called "Boltenberg" between Elberfeld and Vohwinkel.

Public transport is available in the immediate vicinity. The  (Wuppertal Suspension Railway) and Wuppertal Zoologischer Garten station on the Rhine-Ruhr S-Bahn (S8, S9) are close by. Arriving by car via the Autobahn 46 is possible but not recommended, since parking lots are in very short supply.

Directors 

 1900-1934: Josef Keusch
 1934-1941: Wilhelm Seiffge
 1942-1947: Eduard Wiedmann
 1947-1950: Martin Schlott
 1950-1967: Richard Müller
 1967-1988: Gerhard Haas
 1988–present: Ulrich Schürer

References

External links 

Zoo Wuppertal on zooinstitutes.com

Zoos in Germany
Buildings and structures in Wuppertal
Tourist attractions in North Rhine-Westphalia
1879 establishments in Germany
Zoos established in 1879